The Private Life of Mark Antony and Cleopatra (Spanish:La vida íntima de Marco Antonio y Cleopatra) is a 1947 Mexican historical comedy film directed by Roberto Gavaldón and starring Luis Sandrini, María Antonieta Pons and Víctor Junco.

The film's art direction was by Luis Moya.

Cast
 Luis Sandrini as Marco Antonio  
 María Antonieta Pons as Cleopatra  
 Víctor Junco as Octavio  
 José Baviera as Julio  
 Rafael Banquells as Marco Antonio  
 Conchita Carracedo as Elena  
 Carlos Villarías as Septimio  
 Julián de Meriche as Ptolomeo 
 Stephen Berne as Gladiador sin melena 
 Fernando Casanova
 Julio Daneri as Guardia pretoriano  
 Pedro Elviro as Ministro Egipcio  
 Jesús Grana as Ministro Egipcio  
 Juan José Laboriel as Esclavo  
 Bertha Lehar as Señora Bernales  
 Miguel Manzano as Policía Egipcio 
 Francisco Pando as Miembro del senado  
 Humberto Rodríguez as Ciudadano Romano  
 Hernán Vera as Depilo

References

Bibliography 
 Elley, Derek. The Epic Film: Myth and History. Routledge, 2013.

External links 
 

1947 films
1940s historical comedy films
Mexican historical comedy films
1940s Spanish-language films
Films directed by Roberto Gavaldón
Films set in ancient Rome
Depictions of Cleopatra on film
Depictions of Mark Antony on film
Depictions of Augustus on film
Mexican black-and-white films
Films scored by Manuel Esperón
1947 comedy films
1940s Mexican films